Charles Parsons Weaver (March 14, 1851 – November 21, 1932) was Mayor of Louisville, Kentucky from 1897 to 1901.

Life
Weaver attended Bryant and Stratton Commercial College. He was elected to the Louisville Board of Aldermen in 1888 and served until 1894. He served as secretary and treasurer of the Kentucky & Indiana Bridge Company from 1889 through 1894. He was appointed postmaster by Grover Cleveland in 1894.

He ran for mayor in 1897 against George Davidson Todd in the first Louisville mayoral election where a Democrat ran directly against a Republican. With the support of political boss John Whallen and accusations of voter fraud, Weaver was elected by a margin of 2,700 votes.

As Mayor, he secured financing to buy Dupont Square and develop it into Louisville's Central Park, although the plan was not completed until 1904.

He died in 1932 and was buried in Cave Hill Cemetery. He was married to Anna Mary Sewell and they had three children: daughters Effie and Jesse; and son William, who served in United States Army during both World Wars and retired as highly decorated Major general.

References

1851 births
1932 deaths
Bryant and Stratton College alumni
Mayors of Louisville, Kentucky
Burials at Cave Hill Cemetery